Nizhny Olshan is a rural locality (a selo) and the administrative center of Olshanskoye Rural Settlement, Ostrogozhsky District, Voronezh Oblast, Russia. The population was 884 as of 2010. There are 12 streets.

Geography 
Nizhny Olshan is located 23 km southwest of Ostrogozhsk (the district's administrative centre) by road. Veretye is the nearest rural locality.

References 

Rural localities in Ostrogozhsky District